

Electric Tonic is a live jazz album by Medeski Martin & Wood. It consists of completely improvised material recorded as one piece at Tonic in New York City on July 4, 1998. Described by the band's website as "electric improvisational birthday music", it had previously been available only at their live shows and through the band's online store. It is now sold online through Amazon. For the Electric Tonic concert, electric keyboards and basses were used by Medeski and Wood respectively, a counterpart to the group's fully acoustic album Tonic, recorded eight months later at the same venue, though released first in 2000.

According to John Zorn's liner notes:

Track listing

Personnel
John Medeski – keyboards
Chris Wood – bass guitar
Billy Martin – drums

Credits
Recorded by Federico Cribiore
Mastered at Sony Studios by Marc Wilder
Cover designed by David Bias

References 

2001 live albums
Live avant-garde jazz albums
Indirecto Records live albums
Medeski Martin & Wood live albums